is a former volleyball player from Japan, who was one of the leading players in the Men's National Team in the early 2000s. He played as a wing-spiker. In 2003 he completed his first season for Sisley Treviso, who reached the final of the Italian League.

Honours
1998 World Championship — 16th place
1999 FIVB World Cup — 10th place
2001 FIVB World League — 9th place
2001 World Grand Champions Cup — 5th place
2002 FIVB World League — 13th place
2002 World Championship — 9th place
2003 FIVB World League — 13th place
2003 FIVB World Cup — 9th place

References
 FIVB biography

1976 births
Living people
Japanese men's volleyball players
PAOK V.C. players